"Who Wrote the Words" is a single written by Terry Carisse and performed by the Canadian country music group Mercey Brothers. In Canada, the song reached number 1 on the RPM Country Tracks chart and Adult Contemporary chart on October 9, 1971.

Chart performance

References

1971 singles
Mercey Brothers songs
1971 songs
RCA Records singles
Songs written by Terry Carisse